Master of Martial Hearts, originally titled , is a 2008–2009 Japanese original video animation series created by Studio Kikan and Shochiku.  It concerns a high school girl who gets involved in a series of fights against other young women with the Martial Heart (Platonic Heart in English subtitled and the Japanese version) as the prize; a jewel that can grant any wish. On January 7, 2010, Funimation Entertainment announced that they had licensed the OVA series in English. The series was released in North America on August 10, 2010.

Development

The series is based on the video game Zettai Shōgeki - Platonic Heart. The characters are designed by Jin Happobi who has illustrated adult games such as Boin. ARMS has produced fan service titles such as Queen's Blade and they made the characters distinct and more realistically proportioned. The musical score was done by Masaru Kuba. The series was directed by Yoshitaka Fujimoto, who had worked on the comedy Girl's High.

A website was launched for the series in July 2008.

Characters

Main 
  is in her second year in high school. In the OVA, she is a generally cheerful and pleasant girl who has a crush on her best friend's brother, but has angsty moods where she mopes and whines. She is pulled into the tournament when Miko drops out and mysteriously disappears. She is a capable fighter, having learned fighting techniques from her mother. When Aya fights, she can turn into a maddening rage, resulting in devastating damage. She is voiced by Kaori Nazuka in the Japanese version, and by Anita Neukar in the English dub.
  is Aya's best friend. In the OVA, Natsume's supportiveness for Aya is an act—in the final episode, she betrays Aya and reveals that she, her brother, and Miko have all conspired to exact revenge on Aya and her family. Natsume's mother is Kumi, the sister of Yumi Kazuki, Miko's mother. Natsume is voiced by Satomi Akesaka in the Japanese version, and by Cherami Leigh in the English dub.
  is a shrine maiden. In the OVA, she initially appears in a fight against Rei, a young woman dressed as a flight attendant. After Aya defeats Rei, Miko explains that she is participating in a tournament that grants any wish upon victory. Seeing that her wish of making friends was fulfilled by Aya and Natsume, she tries to withdraw from the tournament. However, Miko mysteriously disappears later on. Miko later appears at the end of the series as a vengeance-filled enemy of Aya as her mother, Yumi Kazuki, and her aunt, Kumi, were involved in a previous tournament with Aya's mother (Suzuko) ruining their lives. Miko reveals that her father was Shigeyuki Iseshima, who is Aya's father. Even though Aya believed Shigeyuki died in a car accident, in actuality, he stabbed Yumi Kazuki on Miko's fourth birthday and was killed by Kumi the same day. Miko had been looking for Suzuko and her daughter her entire life—she finally achieved her goal upon meeting her cousins, Haruki (Natsume's brother) and Natsume. Their vengeful plan was formed after Miko met Natsume. Miko is voiced by Ai Nonaka in the Japanese version, and by Alexis Tipton in the English dub.

Supporting
 
 Natsume's brother, whom Aya has a crush on. It is revealed in the final episode that Haruki is in a relationship with Miko all along. Tatsuhisa Suzuki voices him in the Japanese version and Ian Sinclair voices him in the English dub.
 
 Aya's mother. She won the previous tournament, dooming Kumi and Yumi Kazuki to sexual slavery. In the final episode, she infiltrates the hideout of Miko, Haruki, and Natsume. Suzuko sets the area on fire and confronts the three perpetrators to save Aya's life. After informing the trio of what their grandfathers did she snaps the necks of Haruki, Miko, and Natsume when they tried to attack her. Suzuko then bandages Aya's wounds, apologizes to her, and helps her flee the building. Afterwards, Suzuko stays behind in the burning building and checks Aya's phone—she finds out that the pieces of the Martial Heart have not been completed. The burning building then collapses, with Suzuko's fate unknown. Naoko Matsui voices her in the Japanese version and Shelley Calene-Black voices her in the English dub.

Competitors 
For the Zettai Shougeki: Platonic Heart video game, the following women were listed in the lineup on the official site as competitors along with the main three girls.
  is Aya's chemistry teacher. Azusa attacks by calling out a chemical formula and then uses a combination of punches and kicks based on it. Although Azusa criticizes Aya for not studying, she has reservations for fighting her. Azusa's motivation for fighting in the tournament is to find her missing father. Azusa is enslaved by Miko after losing to Aya, and Miko uses her as the first "example" of the fate that befalls the losers of the tournament; Aya tries to make her return to sanity, but Azusa is so far gone that she cannot. She is voiced by Luci Christian in the English dub.
  is a flight attendant. In the OVA she had worked since high school to care for her younger brother, since her parents were no longer alive. Her brother fell ill with an incurable disease and she wanted to get money through the tournament to give him adequate medical treatment. By the end of the series, Rei's brother had died; having been tortured to insanity, Miko points out that it is impossible for Rei to know that her brother is dead.  Rei's weapons are a handbag with blades and a spiked scarf. Voiced by: Colleen Clinkenbeard (English)
 The  are part of the alliance. They attempted to scout Aya within their ranks. Sharing Azusa and Rei's fate, all of them are enslaved by Miko after losing. 
 : Nurse. 
 : Police officer. 
 : Geisha. 
  is a Japanese idol singer dressed as a maid. Like all of the ladies before her, Rin is enslaved by Miko after losing. Kristi Kang voices her in the English dub.
 
 Yueli is a Chinese-Japanese psychic. Yueli managed to advance to the final round along with Aya, who is her opponent. Yueli attempts to inform Aya about Miko's true nature, only to provoke Aya, leading to her death. Monica Rial provides her English voice.
 
 Dressed in a white suit, Izumi works for Miko and her group. In the final episode she betrays her masters and tries to strangle Miko, only to be shot dead by Haruki. Wendy Powell provides her English voice.

Other contestants include:
 {{nihongo|Megumi Shimoyama|下山 恵|Shimoyama Megumi}}
 Megumi is a mechanic that is very quickly defeated by Aya and then enslaved by Miko. Jamie Marchi provides her English voice.
 
 Aoi is a delinquent who appears in Zettai Shougeki: Platonic Heart II.

 Others 
 
 Takumi is Aya's perverted physical education teacher. He tried to force Aya to run around the track field with revealing gym clothes for being late, only to have his perverted fantasies foiled by Azusa. Sonny Strait provides his English voice.
 Fake Haruki The fake Haruki is in cahoots with Izumi, working for Miko's group. He has a tendency to alter his physical appearance with plastic surgery to flirt with any girl he sees fit. He meets his demise along with Izumi under the real Haruki, who shoots them dead.
 Kumi Honma (née Kazuki)' The mother of Natsume and Haruki. Several years ago, Kumi and her sister Yumi Kazuki were sold into sexual slavery to a man overseas after she lost the Martial Heart tournament to Suzuko Iseshima. Her vocal cords were destroyed to prevent her from screaming, and she has a noticeable scar on her neck. She escaped from her overseas master and used sign language and writing to tell her children what happened, then through the years she conditioned them to seek revenge for the horrors inflicted on her.. At the end, Suzuko reveals that Kumi had killed Shigeyuki Iseshima after he killed Yumi. Kumi also has a habit of stabbing pictures with Aya in it with a razor blade. In the final episode, she answers the door and is frightened at the sight of the outsider, strongly implied to be Aya. Kumi's actual fate left for open interpretation, but it's believed that Aya killed her either as punishment or to stop the whole cycle of revenge.

Media

OVA
Previews were presented in "blog parts" (miniature applets for blogs) that showcased the bodies of the various characters.
Shochiku released the first volume of the series in Japan on October 25, 2008. Subsequent episodes have been released monthly.

The closing theme for episode 5 is "Zero Gravity" also by Little Non. The OVAs were released in Japan between October 29, 2008 and February 25, 2009.

Other media
Atsushi Kuragami, who did Debiru Naebiru, has serialized a manga version for Futabasha's Comic High! magazine with its debut on August 22, 2008.Slotter Mania V: Zettai Shougeki Platonic Heart II, a pachinko-style game featuring characters from the series, was released for the PS Vita.

Ten companies have planned to expand the franchise into mobile devices, music CD and other merchandise.

Reception
The OVA series received negative reviews from critics. Theron Martin of Anime News Network likens the series to Ikki Tousen where women fight each other with "clothes-shredding attacks" but wrote that Master of Martial Hearts'' has more extreme fan service such as exposed breasts.  The plot "exists almost entirely to give excuses for staging cosplay-like battles." Stig Høgset of THEM Anime Reviews found the show "a pretty simple and terrible story with a really awkward and dumb plot twist at the end, it's just impossible to recommend this show for anyone." He instead recommended other titles for those who are "up for the whole 'sexy girls chopsocky' thing." Mike Ferreira of the Anime Herald wrote that it is "without a doubt, one of the most offensive, vile pieces of crap to pass through my DVD player. It makes Ikki Tousen look like The Gentleman’s Guide in comparison. There are absolutely no redeeming qualities to speak of, and everything just seems to go to extremes to repulse the viewer." Bamboo Dong of Anime News Network praised Funimation for "cutting one of the funniest and most attention-grabbing trailers in recent anime history. Their coinage of 'Boobs, butts, and burgers' is genius," however, "Considering the terrible storyline, the complete lack of characterization, the lackluster animation, and the ear-splitting music, and the complete disregard for science, there is no redeeming feature of this show. Unless, of course, you want something to whack off to." Chris Beveridge of Mania.com found the story to be formulaic with awkward pacing, and leading to a spectacular train wreck of the final episode.

References

External links
   (Archive)
 Zettai Shougeki: Platonic Heart - Dorasu PC Mobile 
 Zettai Shougeki: Platonic Heart - Jin Products  (Archive)
 Zettai Shougeki: Platonic Heart - Aristocrat 
 Zettai Shougeki: Platonic Heart II - Aristocrat 
 絶対衝激～ﾌﾟﾗﾄﾆｯｸﾊｰﾄ～ 「絶対領域」でライバルを倒し、「Platonic Time」で熱くなれ！." Mobage by DeNA. 
  (Archive)
 
 

2008 anime OVAs
2008 manga
Arms Corporation
Fiction about death games
Funimation
Futabasha manga
Martial arts anime and manga
Seinen manga
Studio Signpost